The Les Schwab Invitational (LSI) is Oregon's premier pre-season high school invitational basketball tournament.[1] Prior to its founding in 1996, Oregon's high school teams had to travel out of state for quality pre-season play, denying fans connection to local teams prior to the regular season. In 1994, South Salem High School coach Barry Adams and Beaverton High School coach Nick Robertson, along with the Oregon Athletic Coaches Association, proposed a pre-season tournament to showcase the upcoming season's top teams. After two years of phone calls, lobbying, and meetings, the Oregon State Activities Association approved the proposition and the Oregon Holiday Invitational (renamed in 2000 The Les Schwab Invitational) was born. Since its creation, the tournament has hosted nationally ranked teams from many states including Virginia, New York, Nevada, Louisiana, Texas, Maryland, Georgia, Florida, Pennsylvania, and numerous top teams from California. The LSI is a 4-day, 32-game, boy's high school basketball tournament. It features 16 teams chosen from Oregon’s top schools and elite national teams through a partnership with Nike. Prime Time Sports is the owner and promoter of the tournament which was founded by co-tournament creator John McCallum.

Facts 

 Played in the month of December, usually between the dates of December 26 and January 1.
 Is a 5-day, 32-game, and 16-team tournament.
 Tournament awards include: "The Mr.Hustle Award", "Tournament MVP" and "The Shawn Zinsli Team Sportsmanship Award"
 Participating teams raise money for their basketball programs through ticket sales and sponsor donations
 Oak Hill Academy, from Mouth of Wilson, Virginia has won five LSI championships ('97, '01, '04,'06, '11)
 More than 22 Les Schwab Invitational participants have gone on to play in the NBA
 Kevin Durant, the 2008 NBA Rookie of the Year was a player in the 2004 LSI while at Oak Hill Academy
 Kevin Love is the only freshman to ever be named LSI Most Valuable Player as he did in 2003 while at Lake Oswego High School

Venues 
Year-Venue(s)

 1996 -Westview High School-Portland, OR.; South Salem High School, Salem, OR.; The University of Portland, Portland, OR.; Beaverton High School, Beaverton, OR.
 1997-Lewis and Clark College, Portland, OR.
 1998-Lewis and Clark College, Portland, OR.
 1999-Lewis and Clark College, Portland, OR.
 2000-Memorial Coliseum, Portland, OR.
 2001-Memorial Coliseum, Portland, OR.
 2002-The University of Portland, Portland, OR.
 2003-The University of Portland, Portland, OR.
 2004–Present-Liberty High School, Hillsboro, OR.

Teams invited 

 Oregon State classification 6A and 5A basketball teams as well as the top teams from southwest Washington are invited based on selections made by a committee that meets each January.
 3-4 nationally ranked Nike-sponsored teams are also brought in from around the country.

Past champions 
Year	School

 1996	Beaverton High School Beavers
 1997	Oak Hill Academy Warriors
 1998	Crenshaw High School Cougars
 1999	Jefferson High School Democrats
 2000	Dominguez High School Dons
 2001	Oak Hill Academy Warriors
 2002	Bishop O’Connell High School Knights
 2003	Jesuit High School Crusaders
 2004	Oak Hill Academy Warriors
 2005	Reserve Christian Eagles
 2006	Oak Hill Academy Warriors
 2007	Archbishop Mitty High School Monarchs
 2008	Dominguez High School Dons
 2009	Westchester High School Comets
 2010 DeMatha Catholic Stags
 2011 Oak Hill Academy Warriors
 2012 Lake Oswego High School Lakers
 2013 Rainier Beach High School Vikings
 2014 Montverde Academy Eagles
 2015 Oak Hill Academy Warriors
 2016 Nathan Hale High School Raiders
 2017 Oak Hill Academy Warriors
 2018 Sierra Canyon School Trailblazers
 2019 Mater Dei High School Monarchs
 2020 Cancelled due to Covid-19 Pandemic
 2021 Link Academy Lions
 2022 West Linn High School Lions

LSI participants named McDonald's All Americans 

 Carmelo Anthony |	Oak Hill Academy, Mouth of Wilson, VA 2001
 Andre Barrett |	Rice High School, New York, NY 1999
 Evan Burns |	Fairfax High School, Los Angeles, CA 2000
 Tweety Carter |	Reserve Christian, Laplace, LA 2005
 Tyson Chandler |	Dominguez High School, Compton, CA 2000
 Eric Devendorf |	Oak Hill Academy, Mouth of Wilson, VA 2004
 Mike Dunleavy Jr. |	Jesuit High School, Portland, OR 1998
 Kevin Durant |	Oak Hill Academy, Mouth of Wilson, VA 2004
 Ndudi Ebi |	Westbury Christian, Houston, TX 2002
 Donté Greene |	Towson Catholic, Towson, MD 2005
 JJ Hickson |	Wheeler High School, Marietta, GA 2006
 Brandon Jennings |	Oak Hill Academy, Mouth of Wilson, VA 2006
 Terrence Jones |	Jefferson High School, Portland, OR 2010
 Doron Lamb |	Oak Hill Academy, Mouth of Wilson, VA 2009
 Tywon Lawson |	Oak Hill Academy, Mouth of Wilson, VA 2004
 Kevin Love |	Lake Oswego High School, Lake Oswego, OR	2007
 Kyle Wiltjer |	Jesuit High School, Beaverton, OR 2011
 Jaylen Brown |	Wheeler High School, Marietta, GA 2015
 Ben Simmons |	Montverde Academy, Montverde, FL 2015
 Michael Porter Jr |	Nathan Hale High School, Seattle, WA 2017
 Keldon Johnson |	Oak Hill Academy, Mouth of Wilson, VA 2018
 Vernon Carey Jr. |	NSU University School, Fort Lauderdale, FL 2019

Les Schwab Invitational NBA players 

 Carmelo Anthony – Oak Hill Academy / Portland Trail Blazers
 Tyson Chandler – Dominguez H.S. / Chicago Bulls 2001-06, New Orleans Hornets 2006-09, Charlotte Bobcats 2009-10, Dallas Mavericks 2010-11 & 2014-15, New York Knicks 2011-14, Phoenix Suns 2015–2018, Los Angeles Lakers 2018
 Kevin Durant – Oak Hill Academy / Seattle SuperSonics 2007-08, Oklahoma City Thunder 2008-2016, Golden State Warriors 2016–Present
 Kevin Love – Lake Oswego H.S. / Cleveland Cavaliers
 Greg Monroe – Helen Cox H.S. / Toronto Raptors
 Kemba Walker – Rice H.S. / Charlotte Hornets
 Marvin Bagley III - Sierra Canyon H.S. /  Sacramento Kings
 Jaylen Brown - Wheeler H.S. / Boston Celtics
 Markelle Fultz - Dematha H.S. / Philadelphia 76ers
 Aaron Gordon - Archbishop Mitty H.S. / Orlando Magic
 Dejounte Murray - Rainier Beach H.S. /  San Antonio Spurs
 Terrence Ross - Jefferson H.S. / Orlando Magic
 Ben Simmons - Montverde Academy / Philadelphia 76ers
 Jahlil Okafor - Whitney Young / New Orleans Pelicans
 Michael Porter Jr - Nathan Hale HS / Denver Nuggets
 Keldon Johnson - Oak Hill Academy / San Antonio Spurs
 Payton Pritchard - West Linn H.S. / Boston Celtics

Sponsors 
The current 2022 presenting sponsor is Express Employment Professionals. The tournament's key sponsors are Les Schwab Tires and Nike, both Oregon based companies.

References
Les Schwab Invitational. (2023, January 1). In Wikipedia. https://en.wikipedia.org/wiki/Les_Schwab_Invitational

High school sports in Oregon
Sports in Hillsboro, Oregon
High school basketball competitions in the United States
Recurring sporting events established in 1996
1996 establishments in Oregon
Sports competitions in Oregon
Annual events in Oregon